A (symmetric) -gonal bipyramid or dipyramid is a polyhedron formed by joining an -gonal pyramid and its mirror image base-to-base. An -gonal bipyramid has  triangle faces,  edges, and  vertices.

The "-gonal" in the name of a bipyramid does not refer to a face but to the internal polygon base, lying in the mirror plane that connects the two pyramid halves. (If it were a face, then each of its edges would connect three faces instead of two.)

"Regular", right bipyramids
A "regular" bipyramid has a regular polygon base. It is usually implied to be also a right bipyramid.

A right bipyramid has its two apices right above and right below the center or the centroid of its polygon base.

A "regular" right (symmetric) -gonal bipyramid has Schläfli symbol }.

A right (symmetric) bipyramid has Schläfli symbol , for polygon base .

The "regular" right (thus face-transitive) -gonal bipyramid with regular vertices is the dual of the -gonal uniform (thus right) prism, and has congruent isosceles triangle faces.

A "regular" right (symmetric) -gonal bipyramid can be projected on a sphere or globe as a "regular" right (symmetric) -gonal spherical bipyramid:  equally spaced lines of longitude going from pole to pole, and an equator line bisecting them.

Equilateral triangle bipyramids
Only three kinds of bipyramids can have all edges of the same length (which implies that all faces are equilateral triangles, and thus the bipyramid is a deltahedron): the "regular" right (symmetric) triangular, tetragonal, and pentagonal bipyramids.

Kaleidoscopic symmetry

The  triangle faces of a "regular" right (symmetric) -gonal bipyramid, projected as the  spherical triangle faces of a "regular" right (symmetric) -gonal spherical bipyramid, represent the fundamental domains of dihedral symmetry in three dimensions: , [],, of order . These domains can be shown as alternately colored spherical triangles:
across a reflection plane through cocyclic edges, mirror image domains are in different colors (indirect isometry);
about an -fold or a -fold rotation axis through opposite vertices, a domain and its image are in the same color (direct isometry).
An -gonal (symmetric) bipyramid can be seen as the Kleetope of the "corresponding" -gonal dihedron.

Volume
Volume of a (symmetric) bipyramid:

where  is the area of the base and  the height from the base plane to any apex.

This works for any shape of the base, and for any location of the apices, provided that  is measured as the perpendicular distance from the base plane to any apex. Hence:

Volume of a (symmetric) bipyramid whose base is a regular -sided polygon with side length  and whose height is :

Oblique bipyramids
Non-right bipyramids are called oblique bipyramids.

Concave bipyramids
A concave bipyramid has a concave polygon base.

(*) Its base has no obvious center; but if its apices are right above and right below the centroid of its base, then it is a right bipyramid. Anyway, it is a concave octahedron.

Asymmetric/inverted right bipyramids
An asymmetric right bipyramid joins two right pyramids with congruent bases but unequal heights, base-to-base.

An inverted right bipyramid joins two right pyramids with congruent bases but unequal heights, base-to-base, but on the same side of their common base.

The dual of an asymmetric/inverted right -gonal bipyramid is an -gonal frustum.

A "regular" asymmetric/inverted right -gonal bipyramid has symmetry group , of order .

Scalene triangle bipyramids

An "isotoxal" right (symmetric) di--gonal bipyramid is a right (symmetric) -gonal bipyramid with an isotoxal flat polygon base: its  basal vertices are coplanar, but alternate in two radii.

All its faces are congruent scalene triangles, and it is isohedral. It can be seen as another type of a right "symmetric" di--gonal scalenohedron, with an isotoxal flat polygon base.

An "isotoxal" right (symmetric) di--gonal bipyramid has  two-fold rotation axes through opposite basal vertices,  reflection planes through opposite apical edges, an -fold rotation axis through apices, a reflection plane through base, and an -fold rotation-reflection axis through apices, representing symmetry group  of order . (The reflection about the base plane corresponds to the  rotation-reflection. If  is even, then there is an inversion symmetry about the center, corresponding to the  rotation-reflection.)

Example with :
An "isotoxal" right (symmetric) ditrigonal bipyramid has three similar vertical planes of symmetry, intersecting in a (vertical) -fold rotation axis; perpendicular to them is a fourth plane of symmetry (horizontal); at the intersection of the three vertical planes with the horizontal plane are three similar (horizontal) -fold rotation axes; there is no center of inversion symmetry, but there is a center of symmetry: the intersection point of the four axes.

Example with :
An "isotoxal" right (symmetric) ditetragonal bipyramid has four  vertical planes of symmetry of two kinds, intersecting in a (vertical) -fold rotation axis; perpendicular to them is a fifth plane of symmetry (horizontal); at the intersection of the four vertical planes with the horizontal plane are four (horizontal) -fold rotation axes of two kinds, each perpendicular to a plane of symmetry; two vertical planes bisect the angles between two horizontal axes; and there is a centre of inversion symmetry.

Double example:
The bipyramid with isotoxal -gon base vertices:

and with "right" symmetric apices:

has its faces isosceles. Indeed:
upper apical edge lengths:

base edge length:

lower apical edge lengths  upper ones.

The bipyramid with same base vertices, but with "right" symmetric apices:

also has its faces isosceles. Indeed:
upper apical edge lengths:

base edge length  previous one  
lower apical edge lengths  upper ones.

In crystallography, "isotoxal" right (symmetric) "didigonal" (*) (-faced), ditrigonal (-faced), ditetragonal (-faced), and dihexagonal (-faced) bipyramids exist.

(*) The smallest geometric di--gonal bipyramids have eight faces, and are topologically identical to the regular octahedron. In this case:an "isotoxal" right (symmetric) "didigonal" bipyramid is called a rhombic bipyramid, although all its faces are scalene triangles, because its flat polygon base is a rhombus.

Scalenohedra

A "regular" right "symmetric" di--gonal scalenohedron is defined by a regular zigzag skew -gon base, two symmetric apices right above and right below the base center, and triangle faces connecting each basal edge to each apex.

It has two apices and  basal vertices,  faces, and  edges; it is topologically identical to a -gonal bipyramid, but its  basal vertices alternate in two rings above and below the center.

All its faces are congruent scalene triangles, and it is isohedral. It can be seen as another type of a right "symmetric" di--gonal bipyramid, with a regular zigzag skew polygon base.

A "regular" right "symmetric" di--gonal scalenohedron has  two-fold rotation axes through opposite basal mid-edges,  reflection planes through opposite apical edges, an -fold rotation axis through apices, and a -fold rotation-reflection axis through apices (about which  rotations-reflections globally preserve the solid), representing symmetry group  of order . (If  is odd, then there is an inversion symmetry about the center, corresponding to the  rotation-reflection.)

Example with :

Example with :
A "regular" right "symmetric" "didigonal" scalenohedron has only one vertical and two horizontal -fold rotation axes, two vertical planes of symmetry, which bisect the angles between the horizontal pair of axes, and a vertical -fold rotation-reflection axis; it has no center of inversion symmetry.

Double example:
The scalenohedron with regular zigzag skew -gon base vertices:

and with "right" symmetric apices:
{{math|1=A = (0,0,3), A = (0,0,−3),}}
has its faces isosceles. Indeed:
upper apical edge lengths:

has congruent scalene upper faces, and congruent equilateral lower faces; thus not all its faces are congruent. Indeed:
upper apical edge lengths:

base edge length:

lower apical edge length(s):

4-polytopes with bipyramidal cells
The dual of the rectification of each convex regular 4-polytopes is a cell-transitive 4-polytope with bipyramidal cells.  In the following, the apex vertex of the bipyramid is A and an equator vertex is E.  The distance between adjacent vertices on the equator EE = 1, the apex to equator edge is AE and the distance between the apices is AA.  The bipyramid 4-polytope will have VA vertices where the apices of NA bipyramids meet.  It will have VE vertices where the type E vertices of NE bipyramids meet.  NAE bipyramids meet along each type AE edge. NEE bipyramids meet along each type EE edge.  CAE is the cosine of the dihedral angle along an AE edge.  CEE is the cosine of the dihedral angle along an EE edge.  As cells must fit around an edge,  

 * The rectified 16-cell is the regular 24-cell and vertices are all equivalent – octahedra are regular bipyramids.
 ** Given numerically due to more complex form.

Other dimensions
In general, a bipyramid can be seen as an n-polytope constructed with a (n − 1)-polytope in a hyperplane with two points in opposite directions and equal perpendicular distances from the hyperplane. If the (n − 1)-polytope is a regular polytope, it will have identical pyramidal facets.

A 2-dimensional ("regular") right symmetric (digonal) bipyramid is formed by joining two congruent isosceles triangles base-to-base; its outline is a rhombus, {}+{}.

 Polyhedral bipyramids
A polyhedral bipyramid is a 4-polytope with a polyhedron base, and an apex point.

An example is the 16-cell, which is an octahedral bipyramid, {}+{3,4}, and more generally an n-orthoplex is an (n − 1)-orthoplex bipyramid, {}+{3n-2,4}.

Other bipyramids include the tetrahedral bipyramid, {}+{3,3}, icosahedral bipyramid, {}+{3,5}, and dodecahedral bipyramid, {}+{5,3}, the first two having all regular cells, they are also Blind polytopes.

See also
Trapezohedron

References
Citations

General references
 Chapter 4: Duals of the Archimedean polyhedra, prisms and antiprisms

External links

The Uniform Polyhedra
Virtual Reality Polyhedra The Encyclopedia of Polyhedra
VRML models (George Hart) <3> <4> <5> <6> <7> <8> <9> <10>
Conway Notation for Polyhedra Try: "dPn", where n'' = 3, 4, 5, 6, ... Example: "dP4" is an octahedron.

Polyhedra